Juan Antonio López (born June 15, 1952 in Culiacán, Sinaloa – June 29, 2004 in Culiacán) was a Mexican professional boxer who competed from 1971 to 1992.

López was best known for fighting Wilfredo Gómez twice for the WBC Super Bantamweight title, losing by a knockout in seven rounds the first time, and by a knockout in ten rounds the second time. Most importantly, he is credited with introducing Julio César Chávez to the sport. He retired in 1992 with a 66-19 record (46 KO’s), and trained other fighters from his native Culiacán.

In January 2003, it was learned that López had leukemia. He died on June 29, 2004.

Julio César Chávez told The New York Times in 1992 that he considered López to be his hero as a child and tried to emulate him.

References

External links
 

1952 births
2004 deaths
Boxers from Sinaloa
Deaths from leukemia
Deaths from cancer in Mexico
Mexican male boxers
Super-bantamweight boxers
Sportspeople from Culiacán
20th-century Mexican people